Skënderbeu Korçë are an Albanian football team which are based in Korçë. During the 2017/18 campaign they will compete in the following competitions: Kategoria Superiore, Albanian Cup, UEFA Europa League.

Players 

Italics players who left the team during the season.
Bold players who came in the team during the season.

Pre-season and friendlies

Competitions

Kategoria Superiore

League table

Results summary

Results by round

Matches

Albanian Cup

First round

Second round

Quarter-finals

Semi-finals

Final

UEFA Europa League

First qualifying round

Second qualifying round

Third qualifying round

Play-off round

Group stage

Notes

References

External links

 Albanian Football Association Official Website 
 KF Skënderbeu at UEFA.com 

KF Skënderbeu Korçë seasons
Skënderbeu Korçë
Skënderbeu Korçë
Albanian football championship-winning seasons